Steinbach am Ziehberg is a municipality in the district of Kirchdorf an der Krems in the Austrian state of Upper Austria.

Geography
Steinbach lies in the Traunviertel. About 65 percent of the municipality is forest, and 27 percent is farmland.

References

Cities and towns in Kirchdorf an der Krems District